The Clifton Cantonment is a cantonment town within the city of Karachi, Sindh, Pakistan.

It serves as a military base and residential establishment. It was established by the British Indian Army during 19th century British India, and was taken over by the Pakistan Army in 1947. The cantonment maintains its own infrastructure of water supply and electricity, and is outside of the jurisdiction of the Karachi Metropolitan Corporation. Cantonment Board Clifton provides municipal services.

Neighbourhoods 

 PNT Colony (Samieya Town)
 Bukhshan Village
 Chandio Village
 Chaudhry Khaliquz Zaman Colony
 Clifton (Karachi)
 Clifton Block-7
 Clifton Block-8
 Clifton Block-9
 DHA, Karachi or (Defence Housing Authority, Karachi)
 DHA City, Karachi
 DHA Suffa University
 DHA Phase I
 DHA Phase II
 DHA Phase III
 DHA Phase IV
 DHA Phase V
 DHA Phase VI
 DHA Phase VII
 Delhi Colony
 Gizri Creek
 Gizri
 Madinabad
 Pak Jamhuria Colony
 Punjab Colony

Important roads
 Korangi Road
 Sunset Boulevard
 Khayaban-e-Jami
 Khayaban-e-Ittehad
 Khayaban-e-Bahria
 Khayaban-e-Badban
 Khayaban-e-Hilal
 Khayaban-e-Shahbaz
 Khayaban-e-Sehar
 Khayaban-e-Rahat
 Khayaban-e-Muhafiz
 Khayaban-e-Bukhari
 Khayaban-e-Nishat
 Commercial Avenue
 Khayaban-e-Hafiz
 Khayaban-e-Muslim
 Khayaban-e-Shaheen
 Khayaban-e-Shujaat
 26th Street
 Saba Avenue
 Beach Avenue
 Khayaban-e-Mujahid
 Khayaban-e-Janbaz
 Khayaban-e-Shamsheer
 Khayaban-e-Tanzeem 
 Khayaban-e-Tauheed
 Khayabane-e-Amir Khusro
 Khayaban-e-Tariq
 Khaliq-uz-Zaman
 Gizri Road

See also
 Army Cantonment Board

References

External links

Article on Karachi, Pakistan on Encyclopedia Britannica

Cantonments in Karachi
Coastal cities and towns in Pakistan
Pakistan Navy bases